Suresh Haware or Suresh Kashinath Haware is a member of the Bharatiya Janata Party (BJP) from the Belapur constituency. He was a nuclear scientist till he became a politician. Haware is also the managing director of Haware Engineers & Builders Pvt. Ltd. Haware has stood in the 2009 elections from Belapur constituency.

References

External links
Suresh Haware's official Website

1956 births
Living people
Marathi politicians
Bharatiya Janata Party politicians from Maharashtra
People from Navi Mumbai